Tania Elósegui Mayor (born 13 December 1981) is a professional golfer from Spain. 

Elósegui was born in San Sebastian, Spain. She started playing golf at age 9, and had a successful amateur career before turning professional. 

As an amateur, Elósegui would win a bronze medal at the 2002 World Amateur Championship in Malaysia. She would also win two gold medals in the European Team Championships and two in junior silver medal junior championships. She turned professional in 2005. 

After starting to play on the Ladies European Tour in 2005, Elósegui would not find much success until 2009. She collected one victory at the ABN AMRO Ladies Open and would finish in the top 10 in every event she played in, with her worst finish being 10th. With her consistent 2009 play, Elósegui earned a spot on the 2009 Solheim Cup European Team.

Professional wins (1)

Ladies European Tour (1)

Team appearances
Amateur
European Ladies' Team Championship (representing Spain): 1999, 2001, 2003 (winners), 2005 (winners)
Espirito Santo Trophy (representing Spain): 2000, 2002
European Lady Junior's Team Championship (representing Spain): 2002 (winners), 2004 (winners)

Professional
Solheim Cup (representing Europe): 2009
World Cup (representing Spain): 2007, 2008

Solheim Cup record

External links

Spanish female golfers
Golfers from the Basque Country (autonomous community)
Ladies European Tour golfers
Solheim Cup competitors for Europe
Mediterranean Games gold medalists for Spain
Mediterranean Games bronze medalists for Spain
Mediterranean Games medalists in golf
Competitors at the 2001 Mediterranean Games
Sportspeople from San Sebastián
1981 births
Living people
20th-century Spanish women
21st-century Spanish women